Fabian Trettenbach (born 17 December 1991) is a  German footballer who plays for DJK Vilzing. He made his debut for Regensburg on 20 July 2013 in a 3. Liga match against SpVgg Unterhaching.

References

External links
 

1991 births
Living people
German footballers
SSV Jahn Regensburg players
3. Liga players
Regionalliga players
Association football defenders